The Central California Conference is a high school sports league in Central California.  It comprises six schools in the Stanislaus and Merced County area.  The league is administered by the California Interscholastic Federation (CIF) Sac-Joaquin Section.

Member schools

Atwater High School
Buhach Colony High School
Central Valley High School
El Capitan High School 
Golden Valley High School
Merced High School
Patterson High School

References

High school sports in California